Wirsberg is a municipality in the district of Kulmbach in Bavaria in Germany.

City arrangement

Wirsberg is arranged in the following boroughs:
 Birkenhof
 Cottenau
 Einöde
 Goldene Adlerhütte
 Neufang
 Osserich
 Schlackenmühle
 Sessenreuth
 Weißenbach
 Wirsberg

References

Kulmbach (district)